Ilya Ulyanov State Pedagogical University is a major higher education and research institution in Ulyanovsk. It was established in 1932.

References

External links
Official site

Universities in Volga Region
Ulyanovsk
Buildings and structures in Ulyanovsk Oblast
Educational institutions established in 1932
1932 establishments in Russia
Teachers colleges in Russia
Universities and institutes established in the Soviet Union